Bulbophyllum rufilabrum is a species of orchid in the genus Bulbophyllum. Its common name is 'The Fox Red Lip Bulbophyllum.' The Bulbophyllum rufilabrum flowers in October and November in the Indo-China region. The flower is 0.3 cm wide and 0.5 cm high. It is made up of three peddles, the outer two forming an open pod shape with a third, red peddle, in the center. The blooms form clusters on the end of the orchid's spikes (stems).

References

The Bulbophyllum-Checklist
The Internet Orchid Species Photo Encyclopedia

rufilabrum
Taxa named by Joseph Dalton Hooker